Oliver is an EP by Irish singer-songwriter Gemma Hayes.

Background and development
Oliver is her third EP release. In late 2008, Hayes confirmed on her MySpace page she intended on releasing an EP to coincide with her December 2008 live dates in Ireland. Due to production issues the release was delayed and a new date was confirmed on 22 February 2009 as 9 March 2009. Hayes later confirmed on 9 March 2009 the release was delayed even further. It would later appear on iTunes on 13 March 2009.

"November" was a track previously performed on Other Voices on RTÉ Television and "Oliver" appeared on her setlist from May 2008. On 9 March 2009 'Ghost' was made available on her MySpace page as a preview to the EP.

Music video
On 26 April 2009 Gemma announced via her Twitter page that filming had begun for the music video to "Oliver" from her Oliver EP.
 The video premiered on 2 June 2009.

CD release
It was confirmed by Hayes on 27 October 2011 that the Oliver EP will be available as a free CD on the re-released edition of Let It Break in 2012. The first 1,000 albums of Let It Break will feature the EP.

Track listing
Except where stated, all songs written by Hayes.
 "Oliver" — 3:18
 "Ghost" — 2:59
 "These Days" — 2:56 (Jackson Browne)
 "Half Light" — 4:19
 "November" — 5:00

References

2009 EPs
Gemma Hayes albums